There are at least two sports venues called Holman Stadium in the United States:

Holman Stadium (Nashua), in New Hampshire
Holman Stadium (Vero Beach), in Florida